Tharcisse Gashaka (born 18 December 1962) is a Burundian athlete who specialized in marathon and long-distance running.

Gashaka competed in the marathon for Burundi in their country's first Olympics at the 1996 Summer Olympics in Atlanta, where he finished 90th, with a time of 2:32:55. In 1997, Gashaka won a silver medal at the Athletics at the 1997 Jeux de la Francophonie in the 10,000 metres.

References

1962 births
Living people
Burundian male marathon runners
Burundian male long-distance runners
Athletes (track and field) at the 1996 Summer Olympics
Olympic athletes of Burundi
20th-century Burundian people
21st-century Burundian people